Sir Peter Stothard (born 28 February 1951) is a British author, journalist and critic. From 1992 to 2002 he was editor of The Times and from 2002 to 2016 editor of The Times Literary Supplement, the only journalist to have held both roles. He writes books about Roman history and his four books of memoir cover both political and classical themes.

Early life 
He was the son of Max Stothard, an electrical engineer who worked at the Marconi Research Centre, Great Baddow. He grew up on the nearby Rothmans Estate. He was educated at Brentwood School, Essex (1962–68); and Trinity College, Oxford, where he became editor of Oxford University student newspaper Cherwell.

Career 
Stothard joined the BBC after leaving university, and wrote for the New Statesman, New Society and Plays and Players. He joined The Sunday Times in 1978 and The Times in 1981, becoming chief leader writer, deputy editor and, based in Washington, US editor. He published Thirty Days: An Inside Account of Tony Blair at War (HarperCollins, 2010) in 2004, based on observations inside Downing Street during the Iraq War.

During a stage of Stothard's editorship, The Times reached an average sale of over 900,000 – the highest in its history. This was, in part, the result of the so-called "price war" that started in 1993 when The Times reduced its cover price and started intense circulation battles against The Daily Telegraph and The Independent.

In 1999, he became involved in a controversial legal dispute over political funding with the Conservative Party Treasurer Michael Ashcroft. Lord Ashcroft sued, but subsequently withdrew his suit after a statement agreed by both parties.

Stothard was named as Editor of the Year in the same year by Granada Television's What the Papers Say.

In 2000, he was diagnosed with a rare form of cancer and was away from The Times for 10 months for successful treatment.

Whilst editor of The Times Literary Supplement, he often wrote about Greek and Roman literature.

In 2010, his first book of memoir, On the Spartacus Road (Harper Press, 2011, 978-0-00-73408-4), combined an account of the Spartacus uprising with elements of autobiography. His second, Alexandria, The Last Nights of Cleopatra (Granta, 2012, 978-1-84708-703-5), extended the same form, including accounts of newspaper life alongside the story of his engagement with Greece, Rome and Egypt. Alexandria... won the 2013 Criticos Prize for literature on themes from ancient or modern Greece. The Senecans: Four Men and Margaret Thatcher, his memoir of the 1980s and '90s, was published in September 2016. The critic Stuart Kelly described Stothard as "one of the most avant-garde practitioners of the form".

He was chairman of judges for the Man Booker Prize for Fiction (2012) and president of the Classical Association. In 2017, he was appointed a Trustee of the National Portrait Gallery. Stothard appears as a character briefly in the first scene of a one-level Tomb Raider expansion videogame made by Core Design in association with The Times. The expansion is called Times Exclusive Level and was released in 2000.

Personal life
He is married to the biographer and critic Ruth Scurr. He has a son, Michael (born 1987), and a daughter, the novelist Anna Stothard (born 1983) from a previous marriage to Sally Emerson.

Honours

He was knighted for services to the newspaper industry in 2003.

In 2013, he was awarded the President's Medal by the British Academy.

Bibliography
 Crassus: The First Tycoon (2022), 
 The Last Assassin: The Hunt for the Killers of Julius Caesar (2020), 
 The Senecans: Four Men and Margaret Thatcher (2016), 
 Alexandria: The Last Night of Cleopatra (2013), 
 On the Spartacus Road: A Spectacular Journey Through Ancient Italy (2010), 
 Thirty Days: An Inside Account of Tony Blair at War (2004),

Book reviews

References

External links 
 Debrett's People of Today

1951 births
Living people
Alumni of Trinity College, Oxford
British male journalists
British newspaper editors
People educated at Brentwood School, Essex
The Times people
Knights Bachelor
Recipients of the President's Medal (British Academy)
Presidents of the Classical Association